The 1900–01 Harvard Crimson men's ice hockey season was the fourth season of play for the program.

Season
Harvard finished the season with an undefeated record, however, they played just three games against two different opponents.

Roster

Standings

Schedule and Results

|-
!colspan=12 style=";" | Regular Season

References

Harvard Crimson men's ice hockey seasons
Harvard
Harvard
Harvard
Harvard
Harvard